The Daniel Worthen House is a historic house in Somerville, Massachusetts.  The modest -story wood-frame house was first owned by Daniel Worthen, a distiller, and is notable as a rare example of Gothic Revival styling in East Somerville.  The house has a jigsaw-cut foliate vergeboard on its gable.  It has a three-bay front facade, with a front-facing gable roof and a single-story shed-roof porch supported by turned posts.

The house was listed on the National Register of Historic Places in 1989.

See also
National Register of Historic Places listings in Somerville, Massachusetts

References

Houses on the National Register of Historic Places in Somerville, Massachusetts